Elachista velox is a moth of the family Elachistidae that is found in Australia, where it has been recorded from New South Wales, the Australian Capital Territory and Tasmania. The habitat ranges from mallee to rainforests.

References

velox
Moths described in 2011
Endemic fauna of Australia
Moths of Australia